"You're Nobody 'til Somebody Loves You" is a song by British singer and songwriter James Arthur. Written by Arthur along with TMS, who also produced the record, it serves as his first single since winning the ninth series of The X Factor in 2012, his second single overall after "Impossible", and the lead single from his self-titled debut album.

Background 

Speaking to Capital FM about the song, Arthur called it: "One of those big, uplifting anthemic tunes. The rest of the album is quite diverse." The song received its debut airplay on Capital FM on 9 September 2013.

Reception

Critical reception 
Writing for the Metro, Seamus Duff said "With a possibly genuine new talent about to take the charts, The X Factor might in fact have produced their best winner yet." Robert Copsey of Digital Spy gave it four stars out of five, saying "It's hard times when nobody wants you," he sings in his unmistakably wobbly, soul-soaked vocal over a barrage of horns and toe-tapping percussion. Unsurprisingly, the result feels just as big - if not bigger - than before.

Chart performance 
The single reached number 17 in New Zealand on 17 October 2013 and number 22 in Australia three days later. On 27 October, it debuted at number two on the UK Singles Chart, behind "Royals" by Lorde.

Music video 
The song's official music video was directed by Emil Nava and was uploaded to YouTube on 19 September 2013. It features Arthur performing at a street gig.

Track listing

Charts and certifications

Weekly charts

Year-end charts

Certifications

Radio and release history

References 

2013 singles
James Arthur songs
2013 songs
Syco Music singles
Song recordings produced by TMS (production team)
Songs written by Peter Kelleher (songwriter)
Songs written by Tom Barnes (songwriter)
Songs written by Ben Kohn
Songs written by James Arthur